The 1946 Roussillon Grand Prix (formally the I Grand Prix du Roussillon) was a Grand Prix motor race held at Circuit des Platanes de Perpignan on 30 June 1946.

Entry list

Classification
Jean-Pierre Wimille and Raymond Sommer held the race until piston troubles show up and oblige the Maserati 4CL to retire. Since then, Wimille wasn't in danger to win the race.

Pole position: Jean-Pierre Wimille in ?
Fastest lap: Raymond Sommer in 1:36.0 (95.32 km/h).

References

Roussillon Grand Prix
Roussillon Grand Prix
Roussillon
June 1946 sports events in Europe